Tropidophis paucisquamis, or the Brazilian dwarf boa, is a species of snake in the family Tropidophiidae. The species is endemic to Brazil.

References

Tropidophiidae
Endemic fauna of Brazil
Reptiles described in 1901
Snakes of South America
Reptiles of Brazil